Solaris Center is a shopping and entertainment complex in Tallinn, Estonia. It is the largest entertainment, trade and cultural center in Tallinn.
The center was projected by Raivo Puusepp.
It was opened on March 2009.
The net area of the center is 6,235 m².

In the center, there is located 1800-place Nokia Concert Hall, also Cinamon Cinema Centre and Artis Art House is located there.

References

External links

2009 establishments in Estonia
Buildings and structures in Tallinn
Shopping centres in Estonia
Shopping malls established in 2009
Tourist attractions in Tallinn